Introducing the Seekers is the debut studio album by the Australian group the Seekers. It was released in 1963 and was the 10th biggest selling album in Australia in 1968.

Track listing
Side A
 "Dese Bones G'wine Rise Again" (traditional; arranged by the Seekers) - 3:30
 "When the Stars Begin to Fall" - 4:00
 "Run Come See"	- 3:30
 "This Train" (traditional; arranged by the Seekers) - 3:00
 "All My Trials" (traditional; arranged by the Seekers) - 3:30
 "The Light From the Lighthouse" - 2:40

Side B
 "Chilly Winds" (John Phillips, John Stewart)	- 2:34
 "Kumbaya" - 3:00
 "The Hammer Song" (Pete Seeger, Lee Hays) - 2:53
 "Wild Rover" (traditional; arranged by the Seekers) - 2:20
 "Katy Cline" - 2:20
 "Lonesome Traveller" (Lee Hays) - 2:35

In 2018, a digitally remastered version of the album was released with the title The Hammer Song, on which the version of "All My Trials" is 4:00 long.

Personnel
The Seekers
Athol Guy
Bruce Woodley
Judith Durham
Keith Potger
Technical
Russ Thompson - engineer
Barrie Bell - cover

Charts

Weekly charts

Year-end charts

References

External links

1963 debut albums
The Seekers albums